Fade Ogunro is an on-air-personality, radio and TV presenter, film producer, and fashion designer. She is the founder and CEO of Bookings Africa, an online talent service provider in Africa. She is a native of Ekiti State in South West Nigeria. She speaks English, French and Spanish.

Education and career 
Fade Ogunro left Nigeria to the United Kingdom with her parents when she was 7 years old. She studied journalism and creative writing in Roehampton University, UK. After her university education, she worked for Google in the UK. She came back to Nigeria in 2010 and started working for Radio Continental the same year. She has worked for PM News, Guardian Newspaper,   234 Next and Beat 99.9 FM radio.
She hosts radio shows on weekends in the Beat 99.9FM. She is also a co-host of a TV show called Glam Report.

She resigned from Beat 99.9 FM radio in 2016.

In April 2019, she launched a new app called Bookings Africa.  The app enables participants to search for individuals with different talents, reaches these people, get the prices for their services and compare such prices with other service providers. The app has over 14 talent categories and is available in Nigeria, Kenya and South Africa 

She is the co-owner and head of production in FilmFactoryNG a video production company. She also runs her own fashion show called Fashion Friday with Fade.
She is the first African woman to sit on the Global Campaign Board of Cherie Blair Foundation For Women, a foundation that helps discover women entrepreneurs in low and middle income countries.

Ogunro is a former ballerina. She is sponsoring Anthony Mmesoma Madu, an 11 year old ballerina whose video went viral in 2020.

Personal life
Ogunro is the daughter of Sesan Ogunro Snr , one of the pioneer Advertising practitioners in Nigeria who was murdered in 2013. She is sister to video director Sesan Ogunro and they run production company, Film Factory together.

See also 
The Ascension (2face Idibia album)

References 

Living people
21st-century Nigerian businesswomen
21st-century Nigerian businesspeople
People from Ekiti State
Year of birth missing (living people)
Nigerian technology businesspeople
Nigerian television presenters
Nigerian women television presenters
Nigerian radio presenters
Nigerian women radio presenters
Nigerian film producers
Nigerian women film producers